Dilbagh Singh Kler (14 April 1936 – 18 October 2012) was a Malaysian middle-distance runner. He competed in the men's 3000 metres steeplechase at the 1964 Summer Olympics.

References

1936 births
2012 deaths
Athletes (track and field) at the 1964 Summer Olympics
Malaysian male middle-distance runners
Malaysian male steeplechase runners
Olympic athletes of Malaysia
Athletes (track and field) at the 1962 British Empire and Commonwealth Games
Athletes (track and field) at the 1966 British Empire and Commonwealth Games
Commonwealth Games competitors for North Borneo
People from Sabah
Place of birth missing
Southeast Asian Games medalists in athletics
Southeast Asian Games gold medalists for Malaysia